Nancy Kovack (born March 11, 1935) is a retired American film and television actress.

Early years
Kovack is the daughter of Mr. and Mrs. Michael A. Kovack of Flint, Michigan. Her father was the manager of a General Motors plant.

Career

After working as a model, Kovack became one of the Glee Girls for Jackie Gleason.

She has appeared on a number of television series including Bewitched (3 episodes, playing Darrin Stephens' ex-girlfriend and Samantha Stephens' nemesis, Sheila Sommers and Italian client Clio Vanita), Batman (episodes 5 and 6), I Dream of Jeannie, Get Smart, Perry Mason, 12 O'Clock High, The Man from U.N.C.L.E., The Invaders (episode "Task Force" (1967)), Burke's Law, Family Affair (episode "Family Plan" (1968)), The Name of the Game, and Hawaii Five-O (episode "Face of the Dragon" (1969)). She appeared in a key role as a native medicine woman and femme fatale in one of the original Star Trek episodes, "A Private Little War" (1968). In 1969, she was nominated for an Emmy Award for Outstanding Single Performance by an Actress in a Supporting Role for an appearance on Mannix.

In addition to her guest appearances on television programs, Kovack was hostess of the game show Beat the Clock.

As her profile increased, Kovack began to gain roles in Hollywood movies, most notably as the high priestess Medea in Jason and the Argonauts (1963). She also had roles in Strangers When We Meet (1960) with Kirk Douglas and Kim Novak, Diary of a Madman (1963) with Vincent Price, The Outlaws Is Coming (1965) with The Three Stooges, Sylvia (1965) with Carroll Baker, The Great Sioux Massacre (1965), The Silencers (1966) with Dean Martin, Tarzan and the Valley of Gold (1966) with Mike Henry, Frankie and Johnny (1966) with Elvis Presley, and Carl Reiner's directorial debut Enter Laughing (1967).

On Broadway, she appeared in The Disenchanted. Her last film role was in Marooned (1969), a science-fiction drama starring Gregory Peck and Gene Hackman. Credited as Nancy Mehta, she played the murder victim in the TV movie/series pilot Ellery Queen (also known as Too Many Suspects, 1975).

Besides her acting in the United States, Kovack starred in three films that were made in Iran.

Personal life
In 1969, Kovack married Indian conductor Zubin Mehta, who was music director of the Los Angeles Philharmonic and later the music director of the New York Philharmonic. Until 2006, Kovack and Mehta spent some months of the year in residence in Munich, Germany, where Mehta was the music director of the Bavarian State Opera. 

Susan McDougal worked as Kovack's personal assistant in the early 1990s. After her employment ended, Kovack took legal action against McDougal for alleged embezzlement. McDougal was acquitted in 1998 on all twelve charges. A suit by McDougal in 1999 for malicious prosecution ended in a settlement.

Kovack is a Christian Scientist.

Filmography

 Strangers When We Meet (1960) – Marcia
 Cry for Happy (1961) – Camille Cameron
 The Wild Westerners (1962) – Rose Sharon
 Diary of a Madman (1963) – Odette Mallotte
 Jason and the Argonauts (1963) – Medea
 Bewitched (TV Series, 1964) – Sheila Sommers
 The Outlaws Is Coming (1965) – Annie Oakley
 Sylvia (1965) – Big Shirley
 Honey West (TV series) The Gray Lady (1965) – Nicole 
 The Great Sioux Massacre (1965) – Libbie Custer
 The Silencers (1966) – Barbara
 Frankie and Johnny (1966) – Nellie Bly
 Tarzan and the Valley of Gold (1966) – Sophia Renault
 Diamond 33 (1966)
 Batman Episodes 5 and 6 (1966) – Queenie
 Town's Hero (1967)
 Enter Laughing (1967) – Linda aka Miss B
 Shab-e-fereshtegan, aka Night of the Angels (1968)
 Star Trek: The Original Series (TV Series, 1968) Season 2: A Private Little War - Nona
 Marooned (1969) – Teresa Stone
 Hawaii Five-O (TV Series, 1969) Season 1: Face of the Dragon - Dr. Alexandria Kemp
 Mannix (TV Series, 1973)

References

External links

 
 
 Nancy Kovack profile, cultsirens.com; accessed February 16, 2015.
 

1935 births
Living people
20th-century American actresses
American film actresses
American musical theatre actresses
American television actresses
Actresses from Michigan
Actors from Flint, Michigan
University of Michigan alumni
American Christian Scientists